Annie Crowe Austin was  Mistress of Girton College, Cambridge from October 1870  until illness forced her to relinquish her duties in May 1872. when Emily Davies took over, at first on an interim basis; and then from October 1872, as Austin's permanent replacement.

References

Alumni of the Home and Colonial Training College
Women educators